Catete may refer to:
 Catete, Ícolo e Bengo, a small town and commune in the municipality of Icolo e Bengo, Luanda Province, Angola
 Catete, Rio de Janeiro, a district in Rio de Janeiro, Brazil
 Catete River (Iriri River), a tributary of the Iriri River in Pará state in north-central Brazil
 Catete River (Itacaiunas River), a tributary of the Itacaiunas River in Pará state in north-central Brazil
 Catete Palace, a former presidential palace in Catete, Rio de Janeiro